The Martin BM was a 1930s American torpedo bomber built by the Glenn L. Martin Company for the United States Navy.

Design and development
To meet the requirement for a special-purpose dive bomber for the United States Navy and United States Marine Corps, the US Navy's Bureau of Aeronautics designed a biplane with fixed tailwheel landing gear, designated Bureau Design 77. It had room for two crew in tandem. Two prototypes were ordered in June 1928, one from Martin (designated the XT5M-1) and one from the Naval Aircraft Factory (designated the XT2N-1).

The Martin XT5M-1 was powered by a  Pratt & Whitney R-1690-22 Hornet radial engine, and, following test during 1930, the Navy ordered 12 aircraft from Martin with the designation BM-1. The BM-1 had a more powerful R-1690-44 engine. A further order for four was followed by an order for 16 for the BM-2.

Martin moved to a new factory in Baltimore, Maryland, where the XT5M-1 was built, and it was first flown on 17 May 1929. During testing, the aircraft suffered structural damage during a pullout from a dive and had to be returned to the factory. After a redesign and rebuilding of the wings, the XTM5-1 was handed over to the Navy in May 1930 for service trials.

In April 1931, the Navy ordered 16 production aircraft to be designated the BM-1. Another 16 were ordered in October 1931 as the BM-2, a variant with minor improvements. The prototype was flown aboard the Langley from November 1931 to prove its suitability as a carrier aircraft.

Operational history
The first production BM-1 A8879 was delivered to the Navy at Anacostia for acceptance testing in September 1931. The Navy refused to accept the type after A8879 had a fatal crash during a test dive in September 1931. Martin modified the second production aircraft, used the same serial as the crashed aircraft and redelivered it to the Navy in January 1932. The second A8879 was accepted by the Navy on 27 February 1932 and it was followed by the delivery of 15 more, with the last being accepted in July 1931.

In June 1932 the BM-1s were delivered to VT-1S squadron on board USS Lexington to replace the Martin T4Ms. In March 1933 the squadron was renamed VT-1B when it became part of the Battle Force, by October 1932 it had ten BM-1s and ten BM-2s in service.

Between July 1934 and February 1935, the BM-1 and BM-2 was also operated by VB-3B, when it was formed for service aboard the Ranger. Other carrier squadrons also operated the BMs for short periods before they moved on to other aircraft, including VB and VT5 (Yorktown) and VT6 (Enterprise).  By the middle of 1938 only a small number of aircraft remained in service, most with VX-3D4 and VX-4D4 which were experimental squadrons based at Philadelphia. By the end of 1939, all BM-1s and BM-2s were out of service.

An additional aircraft designated XBM-1 was built for trials and testing with the National Advisory Committee for Aeronautics.

Variants

XT5M-1
Prototype with R-1690-22 engine, one built.
XT2N-1
Prototype built by Naval Aircraft Factory
BM-1
Production aircraft, 17 built.
BM-2
Production aircraft with minor changes, 16 built.
XBM-1
Additional aircraft for trials and testing, transferred to NACA in 1940.

Operators

National Advisory Committee for Aeronautics
United States Navy
VT-1S/VT-1B/VB-1B/[[VT-2 (1932–38)
VB-3B (1934–35)
VB-5 (1938)
VT-5 (1937–38)
VT-6 (1937–38)

Accidents and incidents
Of the 35 aircraft built only seven were lost in accidents:
6 November 1931 BM-1 A8879 crashed during acceptance trials.
4 January 1933 BM-2 A9181 of the Scouting Force Pool force landed at Durham, North Carolina after it ran out of fuel.
27 August 1934 BM-1 A8888 of VB-1B force-landed in Arizona during bad weather and damaged beyond repair.
27 March 1935 BM-1 A8889 of VB-1B flew into the water during night operations from Lexington off California.
7 December 1936 BM-2 A9174 of VB-1B flew into the sea after it failed to recover from a practice dive.
12 March 1938 BM-1 A8880 of VT-5 crashed on landing at Hagerstown, Maryland.
19 April 1938 BM-1 A9217 of VB-5 had a landing accident when it overran and overturned at Virginia Beach.

Specifications (BM-2)

References

Further reading

 
 

BM
Martin BM1
Single-engined tractor aircraft
Carrier-based aircraft
Biplanes